The women's triple jump event at the 1998 World Junior Championships in Athletics was held in Annecy, France, at Parc des Sports on 1 and 2 August.

Medalists

Results

Final
2 August

Qualifications
1 Aug

Group A

Group B

Participation
According to an unofficial count, 21 athletes from 16 countries participated in the event.

References

Triple jump
Triple jump at the World Athletics U20 Championships